Xestopus is a genus of ground beetles in the family Carabidae. There are about eight described species in Xestopus.

Species
These eight species belong to the genus Xestopus:
 Xestopus alticola (Fairmaire, 1889)  (China, India, and Myanmar)
 Xestopus bhutanensis (Morvan, 1979)  (Bhutan)
 Xestopus cordicollis (Morvan, 1979)  (Bhutan)
 Xestopus cyaneus Sciaky & Facchini, 1997  (China)
 Xestopus gutangensis Zhu & Kavanaugh, 2021  (China)
 Xestopus kumatai (Habu, 1973)  (Nepal)
 Xestopus nepalensis Morvan, 1982  (Nepal)
 Xestopus walteri (Morvan, 1978)  (Bhutan)

References

Platyninae
Taxa named by Herbert Edward Andrewes